This is a list of all the captains who played for the Italy national football team.

Francesco Calì was the first captain of the Italy national football team.

The only players who were captains in all matches they have played in the national team were Giuseppe Milano (11 appearances), Francesco Calì (2 caps) and Giulio Cappelli (2 caps).

Gianluigi Buffon wore the captain band the most times: 80.

Gianluigi Buffon is also the goalkeeper who has worn the captain band the most times: 80.

Valentino Mazzola and Sandro Mazzola as well as Cesare Maldini and Paolo Maldini are the only cases of father and son who have worn the captain band during their respective times on the national team. Goalkeepers, Gianluigi Buffon and Lorenzo Buffon are distant cousins. Attilio Ferraris and Pietro Ferraris, despite the same surname, are not relatives.

Leonardo Bonucci is the current captain of the national team.

List of captains by appearances
Updated as of 20 November 2022.

Players in bold are still active. Players in italics served as the designated captain for his captaincy period.

List of captains by captaincy period
List of captaincy periods of the various captains throughout the years.

 1910 Francesco Calì
 1911–1914 Giuseppe Milano
 1914–1915 Virgilio Fossati
 1920–1925 Renzo De Vecchi
 1925–1927 Luigi Cevenini
 1927–1930 Adolfo Baloncieri
 1931–1934 Umberto Caligaris
 1934 Gianpiero Combi
 1935–1936 Luigi Allemandi
 1937–1939 Giuseppe Meazza
 1940–1947 Silvio Piola
 1947–1949 Valentino Mazzola
 1949–1950 Riccardo Carapellese
 1951–1952 Carlo Annovazzi
 1952–1960 Giampiero Boniperti
 1961–1962 Lorenzo Buffon
 1962–1963 Cesare Maldini
 1963–1966 Sandro Salvadore
 1966–1977 Giacinto Facchetti
 1977–1983 Dino Zoff
 1983–1985 Marco Tardelli
 1985–1986 Gaetano Scirea
 1986–1987 Antonio Cabrini
 1988–1991 Giuseppe Bergomi
 1991–1994 Franco Baresi
 1994–2002 Paolo Maldini
 2002–2010 Fabio Cannavaro
 2010–2018 Gianluigi Buffon
 2018–2022 Giorgio Chiellini
 2022–present Leonardo Bonucci

Notes

References

External links
 Federazione Italiana Giuoco Calcio - Captains

Captain
Italy captains
Association football player non-biographical articles